Wyodak is an unincorporated community in east-central Campbell County, Wyoming, United States.

History
Wyodak began circa 1925 and existed to house Wyodak Coal Company employees. In the 1960s the company planned to mine the area and the houses were gradually moved.

Transportation
The following highways pass through Wyodak:

References

External links

Unincorporated communities in Campbell County, Wyoming
Unincorporated communities in Wyoming